Workers' Militia PPS-WRN (MR PPS-WRN) often referred to simply as Militia PPS-WRN, was a Polish underground paramilitary formation of the Polish Socialist Party – Freedom, Equality, Independence active during the occupation of Poland by Nazi Germany and the Soviet Union in World War II between 1939 and 1945. The total number of clandestine members of MR PPS-WRN reached 30,000 at the time of the Soviet counter-offensive of 1944. They participated in both Operation Tempest against the Nazis (Akcja Burza) and in the Warsaw Uprising of 1944. MR PPS-WRN was created in November 1939 amongst the prewar labour circles in Warsaw, Radom, Kraków, in Upper Silesia (Śląsk) and in the Dąbrowa Basin (Zagłębie) mainly for self-protection. It was supposed to help recreate the Polish prewar police and counter—intelligence services.

Since June 1940 the Commander-in-chief of the Workers' Militia PPS-WRN was Antoni Pajdak nom de guerre "Traugutt"; captured by the Soviet NKVD in March 1945 and sent to GULAG for 10 years after his Moscow trial. His second-in-command in occupied Poland were: Stanisław Sobolewski pseudonym "Krystian", and Jan Władysław Wilczyński pseudonym "Gnat".  The organization was divided and subdivided into the units of five.

The status report for the organization as of 1944

Underground force of PPS-WRN in Silesia and in Zagłębie
According to fragmentary data in Sosnowiec in 1944, the Militia of PPS counted 475 members in five districts. In Będzin County, it was around 200 persons strong or 15 platoons. 
In Silesia, the Militia counted around 3,000, and in the Cieszyn Silesia around 960. In addition, PPS tried to create industrial militia in Zagłębie, under the command of Stefan Kura-Granicki "Gromek", "Gołąb", "Oset", and later, under Henryk Żmijewski  "Kuba". The Industrial Militia operated within the military factories gathering the intelligence and committing acts of sabotage as well as, later on, tried to prevent demolition of factories by the withdrawing Germans.

See also
Blue Police
Jewish Ghetto Police
Lithuanian Security Police
National Security Corps (Państwowy Korpus Bezpieczeństwa)
Polnisches Schutzmannschaftsbataillon 202

Notes

Further reading
 Mariusz Jarosiński (5 November 2009), "Proces Pużaka i innych przywódców PPS-WRN" Portal historyczny Dzieje.pl.
 Andrzej Czystowski, "Wolność, Równość, Niepodległość (22 October 1939-11 February 1945)," in: Z pola walki No. 3, 1988.
 Jan Kantyka, Polska Partia Socjalistyczna na Śląsku i w Zagłębiu Dąbrowskim w latach 1939-1948, Katowice, 1975.

1939 establishments in Poland
1945 disestablishments in Poland
Defunct law enforcement agencies of Poland
Military units and formations of Poland in World War II
Polish Socialist Party
Polish underground organisations during World War II
Socialist organisations in Poland